Daniel Colindres Solera (born 10 January 1985) is a Costa Rican professional footballer who plays as a forward for Bangladesh Premier League club Abahani Limited Dhaka.

Club career
Colindres came through the youth ranks at Saprissa and made his debut with the first team in 2010. After appearing in three matches for Saprissa, he was loaned to Guápiles. With Guápiles he appeared in 43 matches scoring 9 goals. In 2012, he returned to Saprissa and appeared in 32 matches scoring 5 goals in his second stint with the club. He was again loaned out in January 2013, for six months to Puntarenas. With Puntarenas he scored 7 goals in 20 matches. Upon returning to Saprissa, Colindres became an important attacking player for the club, playing primarily as a winger and being noted for his pace and play making ability. During his time with the club he helped Saprissa in capturing 5 domestic titles.

On 13 September 2018, Colindres moved abroad for the first time in his career and joined Bangladeshi club Bashundhara Kings on a nine-month contract, becoming the first ever Costa Rican World Cup player to play in Bangladesh.

On 25 September 2021, Colindres officially returned to the Bangladesh Premier League this time joining Abahani Limited Dhaka.

International career
Colindres made his debut for Costa Rica in a September 2011 friendly match against the USA.

In May 2018, he was named in Costa Rica's 23 man squad for the 2018 FIFA World Cup in Russia.

Career statistics

International

Honours
Saprissa
Liga FPD: Clausura 2010, Clausura 2014, Apertura 2014, Apertura 2015, Apertura 2016, Clausura 2018, Clausura 2021
Costa Rican Cup: 2013

Bashundhara Kings
Bangladesh Premier League: 2018–19
Independence Cup: 2019
Bangladesh Federation Cup: 2020

Dhaka Abahani
 Independence Cup: 2021–22
 Federation Cup: 2021–22

Personal life
Colindres father, Santiago Colindres, was a Honduran, who lived in Costa Rica

References

External links

aldia.cr
diez.hn
, for reference No.3

1985 births
Living people
People from Alajuela
Association football forwards
Costa Rican footballers
Costa Rican expatriate footballers
Costa Rica international footballers
Deportivo Saprissa players
Santos de Guápiles footballers
Puntarenas F.C. players
Liga FPD players
Bangladesh Football Premier League players
Bashundhara Kings players
Abahani Limited (Dhaka) players
2018 FIFA World Cup players
Expatriate footballers in Bangladesh